Jyoti Ann Burrett (born 18 September 1989) is an Indian football player who started her career with Delhi state team. She plays for Kickstart FC in Indian Women's League.

Early life 
Born in Dehradun, she studied in Welham Girls' School in Dehradun and Delhi's St. Stephen's College, and also has a master's degree in sports and health science from University of Exeter, UK.

Career 
She started her football career by playing for Jaguar Eves, a Club in Delhi. Around the same time, Burrett was selected to be a part of the 23-member squad for the AFC Women's Asian Cup (qualifiers) in 2014 as a forward. She also played for her university team while pursuing her Masters in University of Exeter, UK.

Currently the India women's senior national team striker, she also trained with Tottenham Hotspur during their pre-season camp in June to July in 2012. She was featured in the viral Nike's Da-da-ding video released in 2016 to promote women athletes in India.

Burrett and a few other women players started and registered Delhi Women's Football Players Welfare Association in 2017. This initiative is being supported by Bharatiya Janata Party's National Spokesperson Meenakshi Lekhi, and she has promised the team access a ground in Sarojini Nagar.

She joined Indian Women's League side Hans Football Club for the year 2019. She scored first goal against FC Alakhpura on 7 May 2019.

Honours
India
 SAFF Women's Championship: 2014

See also
 List of Indian football players in foreign leagues

References

External links 
 Delhi Women's Football Players Welfare Association

1989 births
21st-century Indian women
21st-century Indian people
Alumni of the University of Exeter
India women's international footballers
Indian women's footballers
Footballers from Uttarakhand
Living people
Sportswomen from Uttarakhand
Welham Girls' School alumni
Women's association football forwards
Anglo-Indian people
Indian expatriate women's footballers
Expatriate women's footballers in England
Indian expatriate sportspeople in the United Kingdom
Indian Women's League players